Anodontites is a genus of freshwater mussels, aquatic bivalve mollusks in the family Mycetopodidae. Anodontites are present in South and Middle America, as far north as Mexico.

Species 
The table below lists extant species:

Four species are known from fossils (three exclusively so):

References

Bibliography 
 

Unionida
Bivalve genera
Molluscs of Central America
Molluscs of North America
Molluscs of South America
Fauna of the Amazon
Fauna of the Pantanal
Paraná Basin
Magdalena River
Taxa described in 1792
Taxa named by Jean Guillaume Bruguière